Vintage Wings of Canada is a not for profit, charitable organization, with a collection of historically significant aircraft. The facility is located at the Gatineau-Ottawa Executive Airport, Quebec, Canada. It was founded by former Cognos CEO and philanthropist Michael U. Potter. Most aircraft in the collection are in flying condition, or being restored to flying condition and are frequently flown.

The facility is located in a  hangar that was designed to resemble a wartime military hangar. The hangar is open on Saturdays from 9:00 a.m. to 3:00 p.m. for public visitors. Visits from Monday to Friday need to be scheduled in advance. As well, the facility is host to group tours, aircraft fly-ins and visits by veterans with prior arrangement.

Vintage Wings is a flying museum, which displays its aircraft in the air and on the ground at many airshows and other events such as Royal Military College of Canada graduation parades, Battle of Britain Sunday parades and many other air shows in Canada and the USA.

Mission
The organization states its mission as:

History
Vintage Wings was created by former Cognos CEO and founder Michael Potter, following his retirement from the company. After retiring Potter developed an interest in collecting "exotic vintage aircraft", starting in 2000. As the collection grew Potter decided to form a foundation to acquire, manage, maintain and fly the aircraft. Potter recruited a cadre of professional pilots, including a number from the National Research Council Flight Test Laboratory, to assist in managing, displaying and flying the aircraft.

Aircraft 
Vintage Wings owns and operates many classic aircraft, most notably various Allied World War II era aircraft.

The aircraft owned by Vintage Wings are:

As of February 2023, Vintage Wings of Canada has three aircraft registered with Transport Canada and operate as ICAO airline designator GHK, and telephony GOLDEN HAWK.B
List of aircraft operated in July 2022:

 de Havilland Canada DHC-1 Chipmunk – two, one of which is registered with Transport Canada 
 de Havilland Canada DHC-2 Beaver
 de Havilland Fox Moth
 Fleet-built Fairchild Cornell
 Fleet 80 Canuck – registered with Transport Canada 
 Fleet Finch II – Model 16B – registered with Transport Canada 
 Hawker Hurricane XII
 Hawker Fury II (under restoration)
 North American Harvard Mk IV
 North American Mustang IV
 Westland Lysander IIIA
 Goodyear FG-1D Corsair
 Supermarine Spitfire Mk IX

Aircraft for sale, sold or no longer in the collection include:

 Beechcraft D17S Staggerwing (sold 2011)
 Bellanca Citabria
 Boeing Stearman
 Canadair Sabre Mk 5 in the markings of the Golden Hawks (up for sale in March 2017)
 Curtiss P-40N Kittyhawk
 de Havilland Canada DHC-2 Beaver
 de Havilland Tiger Moth
 Fairchild Cornell
 Fairey Swordfish Mk III
 Hawker Hurricane Mk IV
 Supermarine Spitfire Mk XVI
 Waco Taperwing ATO (sold in 2011)

Accidents and incidents
The Vintage Wings de Havilland Tiger Moth crashed at the Gatineau Airport on 28 August 2009. The visiting English pilot, Howard Cook, received serious injuries in the accident. He was practicing for the Classic Air Rallye the next day when the aircraft suffered an engine problem and crashed  from the airport runway.

References

External links 

 
 Photos of Vintage Wings of Canada collection

Aviation history of Canada
Aerospace museums in Quebec
Museums in Gatineau